is a Japanese anime director and storyboard artist.

Career
Matsumoto has risen to prominence for being one of the youngest anime directors and one of the few women directors in the industry. She first began working as assistant and episode director for several anime based on the Pretty Cure franchise in the late 2000s. In 2010, she directed the film HeartCatch PreCure The Movie: Fashion Show in the Flower Capital... Really?!, her first work as head director. She directed the ONA Kyōsōgiga in 2012, which was well received. More recently, her direction of 2015's Blood Blockade Battlefront earned her praise.

Filmography

References

External links
 
 

1985 births
Anime directors
Japanese women film directors
Living people
Japanese storyboard artists
Date of birth missing (living people)
Place of birth missing (living people)